The Social and Political Thought of Leon Trotsky, is a history book by professor Baruch Knei-Paz, containing an in-depth analysis of the evolution of the social and political views of Leon Trotsky.

References 
 Beilharz P. Trotsky, Trotskyism, and the Transition to Socialism. — Barnes & Noble Books, 1987. — 197 p. — . — .
 H. B. Review of The Social and Political Thought of Leon Trotsky // Jahrbücher für Geschichte Osteuropas. — 1980. — Vol. 28, iss. 3. — P. 470–470. — DOI:10.2307/41046186.
 Alasdair Macintyre Review of The Social and Political Thought of Leon Trotsky // The American Historical Review. — 1979. — February (vol. 84, iss. 1). — P. 113–114. — DOI:10.2307/1855670.
 Roy E. Thoman Review of The Social and Political Thought of Leon Trotsky // Social Science. — 1981. — Summer (vol. 56, iss. 3). — P. 181–183. — DOI:10.2307/41884738.
 A. Nove Review of The Social and Political Thought of Leon Trotsky // Soviet Studies. — 1979. — April (vol. 31, iss. 2). — P. 310–311. — DOI:10.2307/150118.

External links 
 

1978 non-fiction books
English-language books
History books about Russia
Oxford University Press books